The Los Angeles LGBT Center (previously known as the Los Angeles Gay and Lesbian Center) is a provider of programs and services for lesbian, gay, bisexual and transgender people. The organization's work spans four categories, including health, social services, housing, and leadership and advocacy. The center is the largest facility in the world providing services to LGBT people.

History
The center was founded in 1969, by gay and lesbian rights activists Morris Kight and Don Kilhefner, along with other activists. Originally called The Gay Community Services Center, the original center was located in an old Victorian house on Wilshire Boulevard and was the first non-profit in America to have the word "gay" in its name. In 1998, the organization named its library the Judith Light Library after one of its benefactors, actress Judith Light.  The current CEO is Lorri Jean.

On October 2, 2010, the center became the recipient of a $13.3 million, five-year grant from the federal United States Department of Health and Human Services (HHS) Administration on Children, Youth and Families in order to create a model program for LGBTQ youth in foster care. It was the largest-ever grant by the federal government to an LGBT organization, and the only grant out of six total grants that did not go to a government agency or academic institution.

In 2016, Holly Woodlawn's estate founded the Holly Woodlawn Memorial Fund for Transgender Youth at the center, to benefit some of the center's programs, including Trans Pride L.A., Trans* Lounge, Transgender Economic Empowerment Project, and trans health care services. Woodlawn was transgender herself.

Services

Health
 Primary medical care by providers who specialize in caring for LGBT people
 HIV/AIDS specialty care through its Jeffrey Goodman Special Care Clinic
 HIV and STD testing and treatment
 Individual/group counseling and psychiatric care
 Crystal meth, alcohol and other drug recovery services
 On-site pharmacy
 Health and medical research

Social services and housing
 Emergency shelter and transitional housing for youth
 7 day/week support services for homeless youth, including meals, clothing, showers, etc.
 Support services and activities for seniors
 Legal support, counsel and advocacy
 Hate crime survivor assistance
 Domestic violence survivor assistance
 Youth mentoring and empowerment (LifeWorks)
 Employment support with special programs for transgender people and youth
 Family services and programs

Culture and education
 Performances and exhibitions on the center's stages and in its galleries
 LGBT charter high school
 GED program
 Continuing education and personal-enrichment program (Learning Curve)
 David Bohnett CyberCenter and computer lab
 Community meeting and event space

Leadership and advocacy
 Political and civil rights advocacy
 Suicide prevention in schools (Project SPIN)
 Technical support and assistance to sister organizations
 LGBT cultural competency trainings
 Mentoring and training emerging leaders in strategic domestic and international communities (Emerging Leaders program).

Locations
The Los Angeles LGBT Center operates facilities in seven Los Angeles, CA locations:
 Anita May Rosenstein Campus - Santa Monica Blvd at McCadden Place (new HQ in 2019)
 McDonald/Wright Building - 1625 N. Schrader Boulevard, Los Angeles, CA 90028-6213
 The Village at Ed Gould Plaza (including Renberg Theater) - 1125 N. McCadden Place, Los Angeles, CA 90038
 The Center Weho - 8745 Santa Monica Boulevard, West Hollywood, CA 90069
 Triangle Square - 1602 Ivar Avenue, Los Angeles, CA 90028
 Mi Centro - 553 S. Clarence Street, Los Angeles, CA 90033
 Trans Wellness Center - 3055 Wilshire Boulevard, Suite 360, Los Angeles, CA 90010

See also

 List of LGBT community centers
 Torie Osborn
 LGBT culture in Los Angeles
 Deep canvassing

References

External links
 

LGBT health organizations in the United States
LGBT culture in Los Angeles
LGBT community centers in the United States
LGBT in California
Buildings and structures in Los Angeles
1969 in LGBT history
Organizations established in 1969
1969 establishments in California
Medical and health organizations based in California